Chetang Ridge is a ridge in Alberta, Canada.

Chetang is a name derived from the Stoney language meaning "hawk".

References

Ridges of Alberta